A Tapere or Sub-District is a low level of  traditional land subdivision on five of the Southern Cook Islands (Rarotonga, Mangaia, Aitutaki, Atiu, and Mauke), comparable to the ahupua'a of the main Hawaiian Islands or to the kousapw of Pohnpei. Among the populated raised islands, only Mitiaro is not subdivided into tapere. The remaining Southern Cook Islands, Manuae, Palmerston and  Takutea are atolls and/or uninhabited, and therefore not subject to this type of traditional subdivision. The atolls of the Northern Cook Islands are subdivided into motu (populated atoll islets), instead.

A tapere is a subdivision of a district (the major island subdivision) or puna, which is headed by a district chiefs or Pava (in the case of the Island of Mangaia). A tapere is normally headed by a mataiapo (a chief of a major lineage) or ariki (a High Chief, the titular head of a tribe). It is occupied by the matakeinanga, the local group composed of the residential core of a major lineage, plus affines and other permissive members.

Most of the tapere lands are subdivided among the minor lineages, each of which was headed by a rangatira or kōmono, or by the mataiapo himself.

Below that level, there is the uanga, the extended family, the residential core of which occupied a household.

Historically, taperes were almost always wedge-shaped - the boundaries beginning at defined points on the outer reef and running inland to enclose an ever narrowing strip of land until converging at a point in or near the center of the island. By this type of delineation, any one tapere included every category of soil type and land surface of the island, from the typically mountainous interior, where forest products were collected, through fertile valleys where the major food crops were grown, across the rocky coastal strip of elevated fossil coral (makatea), out to the lagoon and fringing reef.

Overview of Islands subdivided in Tapere

List of Tapere

Aitutaki

Aitutaki is subdivided into eight districts with 19 tapere according to the constitution. The 16 minor islands, 12 of them motu, are outside of this subdivision scheme:
Amuri District
Amuri Tapere
Punganui Tapere
Anaunga District
Anaunga Tapere
Punoa Tapere
Arutanga District
Arutanga Tapere
Reureu Tapere
Nukunoni Tapere
Ureia Tapere
Avanui District
Avanui Tapere
Vaipeka Tapere
Taravao District
Taravao Tapere
Vaiau Tapere
Vaiorea Tapere
Tautu District
Mataotane Tapere
Tautu Tapere
Vaipae District
Oako Tapere
Vaipae Tapere
Vaitupa District
Taakarere Tapere
Vaitupa Tapere

Atiu

In the case of Atiu, the six villages correspond to the six tapere:
Areora Village (Tapere)
Mapumai Village (Tapere)
Ngatiarua Village (Tapere)
Teenui Village (Tapere)
Tengatangi Village (Tapere)

Mangaia

Mangaia is subdivided into six Districts (puna), which are further subdivided into 38 tapere.
In the Cook Islands Constitution however, the six districts are called tapere.
Tava'enga District
Tapere of Ta'iti
Tapere of Te-rupe
Tapere of Maro
Tapere of Au-ruia
Tapere of Te-mati-o-Pa'eru
Tapere of Te-pueu
Karanga District
Tapere of Teia-roa
Tapere of Teia-poto
Tapere of Teia-pini
Tapere of Kaau-i-miri
Tapere of Kaau-i-uta
Ivirua District
Tapere of Avarari
Tapere of Te-i'i-maru
Tapere of Te-uturei
Tapere of Te-ara-nui-o-Toi
Tapere of Te-korokoro
Tapere of Te-pauru-o-Rongo
Tamarua Tapere Map of Tamarua District
Tapere of Te-vai-taeta-i-uta
Tapere of Pukuotoi
Tapere of Vaitangi (Pukuotoi)
Tapere of Te-vai-taeta-i-tai
Tapere of Angauru District
Tapere of Te-vai-kao
Tapere of Akaea District
Tapere of Maru-kore
Tapere of Poutoa-i-miri
Tapere of Poutoa-i-uta
Veitatei District
Tapere of Te-noki
Tapere of Te-tuaroa (Te-tukono)
Tapere of Te-tuapoto
Tapere of Te-tarapiki
Tapere of Kaikatu
Tapere of Angarinoi
Kei'a District
Tapere of Akaoro
Tapere of Tapuata
Tapere of Tongamarama
Tapere of Te-inati
Tapere of Rupetau-i-miri
Tapere of Rupetau-i-uta

Mauke
Mauke is subdivided into four traditional districts. Vaimutu and Makatea are not further subdivided and correspond to one tapere each. Ngatiarua and Areora districts are subdivided into 6 and 3 tapere, respectively, totalling 11 tapere for the whole island:

Ngatiarua District (north)
Tapere of Te Tukunga
Tapere of Mokoero
Tapere of Puneua
Tapere of Ikurua
Tapere of Arakiropu
Tapere of Araki
Vaimutu District (east, corresponds to 1 tapere)
Tapere of Vaimutu
Areora District (south)
Tapere of Tukume
Tapere of Arao
Tapere of Anua
Makatea District (west, corresponds to 1 tapere)
Tapere of Makatea

Rarotonga

Rarotonga is subdivided into five Survey Land Districts (not to be confused with the three traditional Vaka districts that served as local government units with Councils and Mayors from 1997 to February 2008), with a total of 54 Tapere (or sub-districts), more than any other Island of the Cooks Islands:
Arorangi District
Tapere of Akaoa
Tapere of Arerenga
Tapere of Aroa
Tapere of Inave
Tapere of Kavera
Tapere of Pokoinu-I-Raro
Tapere of Rutaki
Tapere of Tokerau
Tapere of Vaiakura
Avarua District (capital of the Cook Islands)
Tapere of Areanu
Tapere of Atupa
Tapere of Avatiu
Tapere of Kaikaveka
Tapere of Kiikii
Tapere of Ngatipa
Tapere of Nikao (seat of Cook Islands parliament)
Tapere of Pokoinu
Tapere of Puapuautu
Tapere of Pue
Tapere of Punamaia
Tapere of Ruatonga
Tapere of Takuvaine (downtown Avarua, seat of Cook Islands government, with Avarua fishing harbour)
Tapere of Tapae-I-Uta
Tapere of Tauae
Tapere of Tupapa
Tapere of Tutakimoa
Tapere of Vaikai
Matavera District
Tapere of Titama
Tapere of Tupapa (not to be confused with a Tapere of the same name in Avarua District)
Tapere of Matavera
Tapere of Pouara
Tapere of Vaenga
Ngatangiia District
Tapere of Turangi
Tapere of Ngati Au
Tapere of Ngati Maoate
Tapere of Ngati Vaikai
Tapere of Avana
Tapere of Aroko
Tapere of Nukupure (Muri)
Tapere of Areiti
Tapere of Aremango
Tapere of Vaii
Tapere of Maii
Takitumu District (Titikaveka)
Tapere of Tikioki
Tapere of Akapuao
Tapere of Te Puna
Tapere of Titikaveka
Tapere of Kauare
Tapere of Arakuo
Tapere of Turoa
Tapere of Totokoitu
Tapere of Avaavaroa
Tapere of Vaimaanga

References

External links
 Cultural Landscapes of the Pacific Islands

Geography of the Cook Islands
Polynesian words and phrases